The Naugatuck Valley League (abbreviated NVL) is a 15-team athletic conference of high schools, located in the Naugatuck River Valley of Connecticut.

The NVL is a member of the Connecticut Interscholastic Athletic Conference (CIAC). It is the oldest high school athletic conference in Connecticut, claiming a continuous history that dates back to at least 1930.

Divisions 

Prior to the 2007–08 school year the NVL member schools' athletic directors  agreed to split the league into two divisions: the Brass and the Copper. The goal of the new structure was to create more competition within the league and enhance each sport's postseason tournament. The names "Brass" and "Copper" were chosen because of Waterbury's history of being centers of brass and copper production.

The addition of Derby High School and St. Paul Catholic High School in 2009 resulted in the first realignment of the league resulted in two sets of divisions—one set for football and the other for all other sports. St. Paul Catholic (which fields a co-operative team with Lewis Mills High School and Goodwin Technical High School in football) was simply added to the pre-existing Copper football division, while Derby (which fields a co-op team with Emmett O'Brien Technical High School in football) was added to the old Brass.

In each of the other NVL sports, the divisions were more drastically realigned. Both St. Paul and Derby were added to the Brass, and Woodland moved from the Copper to the Brass. Crosby and Wilby both shifted from the Brass to the Copper, creating an essentially "city division", with the five Waterbury schools, along with Naugatuck and Torrington.

Expansion of the league (2009—present) 

During the winter of 2009, the existing 12 member schools of the NVL voted in favor of admitting two new schools into the league: Derby High School, moving over from the SCC (Southern Connecticut Conference), and St. Paul Catholic High School of Bristol, which would have been forced to play independently upon the disbanding of the Northwest Conference. Both schools began league play in the fall of 2010.

On February 22, 2013, the Naugatuck Valley League approved the admittance of Oxford High School into their conference from the SWC (South West Conference.) With the move, the NVL announced on November 22, 2013, that the format of two divisions (Brass and Copper) would be realigned into three (Brass, Copper, and Iron) for the start of the 2014–15 school year:

Brass Division

Iron Division

Copper Division

In boys' and girls' basketball, 20 games are played, two against each team within the same division, one each against non-division teams, and two non-league games.

In 2015 Waterbury Career Academy High School joined the NVL bringing it to a membership of 16 schools. In February 2021, Sacred Heart High School announced that it would cease operations following the 2020-21 academic year. Thus, Sacred Heart is no longer a member of the Naugatuck Valley League.

NVL football divisions 

The Naugatuck Valley League football divisions are as follows.

NVL divisions in other sports 

The Naugatuck Valley League divisions in sports other than football are as follows.

Sports 

The NVL offers varsity sports in three seasons: fall, winter, and spring.

Fall sports
 Football
 Girls' volleyball
 Boys' soccer
 Girls' soccer
 Girls' swimming
 Boys' cross country
 Girls' cross country

Winter sports
 Boys' basketball
 Girls' basketball
 Boys' indoor track
 Girls' indoor track
 Boys' swimming
 Cheerleading
 Dance
 Weightlifting

Spring sports
 Baseball
 Softball
 Boys' outdoor track
 Girls' outdoor track
 Boys' tennis
 Girls' tennis
 Golf

Footnotes

External links 
 CIAC Website
 NVL Website
 NVL Football Website

Education in Connecticut
High school sports conferences and leagues in the United States
Sports in Connecticut